Prochasma is a genus of moths in the family Geometridae described by Warren in 1897.

Species
Prochasma mimica Warren, 1897 north-eastern Himalayas
Prochasma dentilinea (Warren, 1893) north-eastern Himalayas, Taiwan, Myanmar, Peninsular Malaysia, Sumatra, Borneo
Prochasma scissivestis Prout, 1926 Borneo

References

Boarmiini